Sharp County is a county located in the U.S. state of Arkansas. As of the 2020 census, the population was 17,271. The county seat is Ash Flat. The county was formed on July 18, 1868, and named for Ephraim Sharp, a state legislator from the area.

Geography

Major highways
 U.S. Highway 62
 U.S. Highway 63
 U.S. Highway 167
 U.S. Highway 412
 Highway 56
 Highway 58
 Highway 175

Adjacent counties
Oregon County, Missouri (north)
Randolph County (northeast)
Lawrence County (southeast)
Independence County (south)
Izard County (southwest)
Fulton County (northwest)

Demographics

2020 census

As of the 2020 United States census, there were 17,271 people, 7,447 households, and 4,420 families residing in the county.

2000 census
As of the 2000 census, there were 17,119 people, 7,211 households, and 5,141 families residing in the county.  The population density was 28 people per square mile (11/km2).  There were 9,342 housing units at an average density of 16 per square mile (6/km2).  The racial makeup of the county was 97.14% White, 0.49% Black or African American, 0.68% Native American, 0.12% Asian, 0.02% Pacific Islander, 0.16% from other races, and 1.39% from two or more races.  0.98% of the population were Hispanic or Latino of any race.

There were 7,211 households, out of which 25.80% had children under the age of 18 living with them, 59.90% were married couples living together, 8.10% had a female householder with no husband present, and 28.70% were non-families. 25.60% of all households were made up of individuals, and 14.40% had someone living alone who was 65 years of age or older.  The average household size was 2.34 and the average family size was 2.79.

In the county, the population was spread out, with 21.90% under the age of 18, 6.30% from 18 to 24, 22.80% from 25 to 44, 25.50% from 45 to 64, and 23.60% who were 65 years of age or older.  The median age was 44 years. For every 100 females there were 92.40 males.  For every 100 females age 18 and over, there were 90.20 males.

The median income for a household in the county was $25,152, and the median income for a family was $29,691. Males had a median income of $23,329 versus $16,884 for females. The per capita income for the county was $14,143.  About 13.20% of families and 18.20% of the population were below the poverty line, including 25.40% of those under age 18 and 13.20% of those age 65 or over.

Government
Over The past few election cycles Sharp County has trended heavily towards the GOP. The last democrat (as of 2020) to carry this county was Bill Clinton in 1996.

Communities

Cities
Ash Flat (county seat)
Cave City
Cherokee Village
Hardy
Highland
Horseshoe Bend

Towns
Evening Shade
Sidney
Williford

Unincorporated communities
Ben-Gay
Ozark Acres
Poughkeepsie

Townships

 Big Creek
 Cave (Cave City)
 Cherokee (most of Cherokee Village, small part of Highland)
 Davidson
 East Sullivan
 Hardy (most of Hardy)
 Highland (most of Highland)
 Jackson (Williford)
 Lave Creek
 Lower North
 Morgan
 North Big Rock
 North Lebanon
 Ozark
 Piney Fork (Evening Shade)
 Richwoods (part of Ash Flat, small part of Horseshoe Bend)
 Scott
 South Big Rock
 South Union
 Strawberry
 Upper North
 Washington
 West Sullivan (most of Sideny)

Sharp County was featured on the PBS program Independent Lens for its 1906 "banishment" of all of its Black residents."

See also
 List of lakes in Sharp County, Arkansas
 National Register of Historic Places listings in Sharp County, Arkansas

References

External links
 Sharp County, Arkansas entry on the Encyclopedia of Arkansas History & Culture
 Sharp County official website 
 Ozark Acres Weather 

 
1868 establishments in Arkansas
Populated places established in 1868